The Office of State Tax Commissioner is a North Dakota state government agency responsible for licensing:
alcoholic beverage wholesalers, farm wineries, microbrew pubs, and out-of-state direct shippers, and
all suppliers selling or shipping alcoholic beverages to liquor and beer wholesalers in North Dakota
and for taxing:
alcoholic beverage wholesalers, farm wineries, microbrew pubs, and out-of-state direct shippers.

Responsibility for licensing alcoholic beverage retail businesses lies with the state attorney general.

History

The current commissioner is Brian Kroshus, who was appointed by Governor Doug Burgum in 2022 after the resignation of Ryan Rauschenberger. 

The office has been used as a pathway to larger roles in North Dakota government; recent Tax Commissioners have run for governor, attorney general, and the U.S. House. 

Former U.S. Senators Byron Dorgan, Kent Conrad, and Heidi Heitkamp all served as Tax Commissioners.

External links
Official Website
Duties of the North Dakota Tax Commissioner

State alcohol agencies of the United States
Main